Correa aemula, commonly known as the hairy correa, is a species of shrub  that is endemic to south-eastern Australia. It has broadly heart-shaped leaves arranged in opposite pairs, green or greyish green, pendent flowers arranged singly or in pairs and ageing to mauve-purple.

Description
The eight stamens extend slightly beyond the end of the petal tube. Flowering occurs in spring and summer.

Taxonomy
The hairy correa was first formally described in 1838 by botanist John Lindley in Thomas Mitchell's book, Three Expeditions into the interior of Eastern Australia. Lindley gave the plant the name Didimeria aemula, but
in 1858, Ferdinand von Mueller, changed the name to Correa aemula in his book Fragmenta phytographiae Australiae.

Distribution and habitat
Correa aemula  occurs on sandy or rocky soils in open forests and heathy woodlands in the Mount Lofty Ranges and Kangaroo Island in South Australia and the Grampians in Victoria. Hybrids with Correa decumbens and Correa reflexa have been recorded.

References

aemula
Flora of South Australia
Flora of Victoria (Australia)
Taxa named by John Lindley
Plants described in 1838